The Philippines competed at the 1952 Summer Olympics in Helsinki, Finland. 25 competitors, all men, took part in 14 events in 7 sports.

Athletics

Basketball

Men's team competition
Qualification Round (Group B)
 Defeated Israel (57-47)
 Defeated Hungary (48-35) 
Main Round (Group C)
 Lost to Argentina (59-85)
 Lost to Brazil (52-71)
 Defeated Canada (81-65) → did not advance, 9th place

Team roster:
Florentino Bautista
Ramon "Ramoncito" Campos Jr.
Antonio "Tony" Genato
José Gochangco
Rafael "Paing" Hechanova
Eduardo "Eddie" Lim
Carlos "Caloy" Loyzaga
Antonio "Pocholo" Martínez (c)
Ponciano Saldaña
Meliton Santos
Antonio Tantay
Mariano "Nano" Tolentino
Head coach: Felicisimo "Fely" Fajardo

Boxing

Men's Flyweight:
 Al Asuncion
 First Round – Defeated Basil Thompson of Burma (TKO 2R)
 Second Round – Lost to Willie Toweel of South Africa (1 - 2)

Men's Bantamweight:
 Alejandro Ortuoste
 Second Round – Lost to John McNally of Ireland (0 - 3)

Men's Lightweight: 
 Benjamin Enriquez
 First Round – Lost to Aleksy Antkiewicz of Poland (0 - 3)

Men's Light-Welterweight:
 Ernesto Porto
 First Round – Lost to Bruno Visintin of Italy (KO 2R)

Men's Welterweight:
 Vicente Tuñacao
 First Round – José Luis Dávalos of Mexico (TKO 3R)

Shooting

Three shooters represented the Philippines in 1952.

25 m pistol
 Martin Gison
 Félix Cortes

50 m pistol
 Félix Cortes
 Martin Gison

50 m rifle, prone
 Martin Gison
 César Jayme

Swimming

Weightlifting

Wrestling

References

External links
Official Olympic Reports

Nations at the 1952 Summer Olympics
1952 Summer Olympics
1952 in Philippine sport